Leonard Seidman Unger (December 17, 1917 – June 3, 2010) was a diplomat and United States Ambassador to Laos (1962–64), Thailand (1967–73), and was the last US ambassador to the Republic of China on Taiwan (1974–79).

Personal life
Unger was born in San Diego, California and graduated from Harvard College with a Bachelor of Arts in 1939. He was the co-author of The Trieste negotiations and co-editor of Laos : beyond the revolution. After retiring from the foreign service, he taught at the Fletcher School of Law and Diplomacy at Tufts University. He died on June 3, 2010, in Sebastopol, California.

Diplomacy career
Unger was a member of the American Academy of Diplomacy and Council on Foreign Relations. He was also the Deputy Assistant Secretary of State for Far Eastern Affairs in the Johnson administration. and the head of the Interdepartmental Vietnam Coordinating Committee, a committee set up by President Johnson to explore various 'use of force' options in the period before United States involvement in the Vietnam war escalated. Prior to his involvement in South-East and East Asia, Unger was the United States Political Advisor to the Free Territory of Trieste.

References

1917 births
2010 deaths
People from San Diego
Ambassadors of the United States to Thailand
Ambassadors of the United States to Laos
Ambassadors of the United States to Taiwan
Harvard College alumni
The Fletcher School at Tufts University faculty